XK may refer to:
 XK (protein), a protein responsible for Kx antigen which helps determine a person's blood type
 XK (2015 album), by Brendan Croskerry
 Jaguar XK, a car series made by Jaguar
 Jeep Commander XK, a SUV made by Jeep
 Republic of Kosovo, ISO 3166-1 alpha-2 user-assigned code element XK (user assigned code)
 CCM Airlines (IATA airline designator XK)
 X-K aka X Kryptonite